During the 1901–02 English football season, Brentford competed in the Southern League First Division. After a torrid season, the Bees were spared relegation after Second Division club Grays United forfeited promotion at the end of the campaign.

Season summary 

Despite having won election to the Southern League First Division in July 1901, the Brentford committee did not rest on its laurels and quickly realised that the team which finished top of the Second Division during the previous season needed drastic improvement if the club was to retain its First Division status. Almost a whole new XI was signed, which included goalkeeper Tommy Spicer, full back David Robson, half backs Bill Regan, Robert Stormont, Charlie McEleny and three new forwards. Half back Ralph McElhaney and forwards E. Andrews, Roddy McLeod and Peter Turnbull, all lynchpins of the promotion team, would play a part in the upcoming season. In late August, the club was registered as a limited liability company.

Brentford began the season in poor form and it took the signings of forwards Tommy Shanks, Paddy Logan and Tom Grieve to inspire the team to its first league victory of the campaign on 9 November 1901. The result inspired three wins and three draws from a seven-match spell through to January 1902, but the team soon regained the habit of losing. Despite the loss of captain Robert Stormont due to an FA suspension and injury problems in February, Brentford struggled on until mid-April and with two matches to go, were level on points with fellow promotion-relegation test match contenders Watford, New Brompton and Wellingborough near the bottom of the First Division. The Bees closed out the season with 7–1 and 3–0 defeats to Portsmouth and Tottenham Hotspur respectively, the top two sides in the First Division. Brentford's 15th-place finish led to a promotion-relegation test match with Grays United, in which the Second Division side forfeited promotion by refusing to play extra time while the score was at 1–1, which preserved the Bees' First Division status.

One club record was set during the season:
 Least Southern League away wins in a season: 0

League table

Results
Brentford's goal tally listed first.

Legend

Southern League First Division

Southern League Test Match

FA Cup

 Source: 100 Years of Brentford

Playing squad

Left club during season

 Source: 100 Years of Brentford, The Football Association

Coaching staff

Statistics

Appearances

Goalscorers 

Players listed in italics left the club mid-season.
Source: 100 Years Of Brentford

Management

Summary

Notes

References 

Brentford F.C. seasons
Brentford